The 2022 UEC European Track Championships were the twelfth edition of the elite UEC European Track Championships in track cycling and took place at Messe München in Munich, Germany, from 11 to August 2022, as part of the 2022 European Championships. This was the second edition of this event, after 2018, which takes place as part of the wider European Championships multi-sport event.

Schedule

A = Afternoon session, E = Evening sessionQ = qualifiers, R1 = first round, R2 = second round, R = repechages, 1/16 = sixteenth finals, 1/8 = eighth finals, QF = quarterfinals, SF = semifinals,SR = Scratch Race, TR = Tempo Race, ER = Elimination Race, PR = Points Race

Events

 Competitors named in italics only participated in rounds prior to the final.
 These events are not contested in the Olympics.
 In the Olympics, these events are contested within the omnium only.

Medal table

References

External links
 Official website
 Results book

 
UEC European Track Championships
European Track Championships
2022 UEC
2022 UEC
August 2022 sports events in Germany
2022 in European sport
2022 European Championships